Tixtla (formally,  Tixtla de Guerrero ) is a town and seat of the Tixtla de Guerrero Municipality in the Mexican state of Guerrero. 
The name is Nahuatl, and means either "maize dough" (masa) from textli; "our valley" from to  ixtla; or "temple by the water" from '' teoixtlen'

History

Antonia Nava de Catalán, a heroine of the Mexican War of Independence, was born in Tixtla. 
Tixtla was also the birthplace of both Independence hero and Mexican president Vicente Guerrero (1783–1831) and writer and educator Ignacio Manuel Altamirano (1834–1893). 
It served as the first capital of Guerrero, from 1851 to 1870, and the state constitution was promulgated there on 14 June 1851.

Culture 

The city is known for its music and festivals.

Geography 

The municipality is located between 17°20' & 17°43' N and 99°15' & 99°28' W, 
It reported 33,620 people in the 2000 census, including 18% Native Americans (speakers of Nahuatl and Tlapaneco).

Other towns in the municipality include Atliaca (population 5,981), Almolonga (1,346), Zoquiapa (1,243), and El Durazno (1,070).

Climate

Notable residents 
 Antonia Nava de Catalán
 Ignacio Manuel Altamirano
 Vicente Guerrero

References

Populated places in Guerrero